Jeffrey Robert Howard (born November 4, 1955) is an American lawyer who serves as a senior United States circuit judge of the United States Court of Appeals for the First Circuit.

Biography 
Howard graduated from Plymouth State College (now Plymouth State University) in 1978 with a Bachelor of Arts degree and he received a Juris Doctor from the Georgetown University Law Center in 1981. After law school, Howard was an attorney in the New Hampshire Attorney General's Office, rising to become Deputy Attorney General.

Political career 
In 1989, he was appointed by Republican President George H. W. Bush to become United States Attorney for the District of New Hampshire. In 1993, he left that position to become the New Hampshire Attorney General, nominated by Republican New Hampshire Governor Steve Merrill. He served as Attorney General until 1997, when he stepped down, allowing Democratic Governor Jeanne Shaheen to nominate Philip McLaughlin. After serving as attorney general, Howard went back to private practice.

Federal judicial service 
In September 2001, Howard was nominated to the United States Court of Appeals for the First Circuit by President George W. Bush. He was confirmed 99-0 by the United States Senate on April 23, 2002. He received his commission on May 3, 2002. He served as chief judge from 2015 to 2022. He assumed senior status on March 31, 2022.

References

External links

Department of Justice Profile

1955 births
Living people
21st-century American judges
Georgetown University Law Center alumni
Judges of the United States Court of Appeals for the First Circuit
New Hampshire Attorneys General
People from Claremont, New Hampshire
Plymouth State University alumni
United States Attorneys for the District of New Hampshire
United States court of appeals judges appointed by George W. Bush